The discography of mewithoutYou, an American rock band, consists of seven studio albums, a live album, seven extended plays (EPs) or maxi singles, eleven music videos, and twenty-nine appearances on compilation, tribute, soundtrack, and split albums or in video collections. The band was formed in 2001 as a side project to The Operation, an alternative band active from 1999 to 2001 that shared most of its members with mewithoutYou. The debut demo EP by mewithoutYou, Blood Enough For Us All, was released in 2000, the year before the band was officially founded. The first undisputed release by the band was I Never Said That I Was Brave which was released on Kickstart Audio in 2001. Over the next year, the band signed to Tooth & Nail Records and released their debut album, [A→B] Life. The album is post-hardcore with shouted and screamed vocals. In 2004, mewithoutYou released their second album Catch for Us the Foxes, which was their first album to chart, reaching number 13 on the Top Christian Albums chart.

Brother, Sister, mewithoutYou's third album (released in 2006), was moved away from the emo and hardcore punk influences of their earlier work and featured less abrasive vocals by Aaron Weiss. Brother, Sister was the first mewithoutYou album to chart on the Billboard 200. With It's All Crazy! It's All False! It's All a Dream! It's Alright in 2009, the band shifted genres entirely, recording an album that is almost entirely acoustic and has been compared to "campfire songs". The band left Tooth & Nail Records in 2011 and released Ten Stories, a concept album about the crash of a circus train, on their own Pine Street Records in 2012. Ten Stories was mewithoutYou's first and only number one album on the Top Christian Albums chart. The band signed with Run for Cover Records in 2015 and released Pale Horses the same year. They released both their seventh studio album, [Untitled], and their only live album, [A→B] Live, in 2018. The band announced in 2019 that the following year would be their last as "an active band". Due to the COVID-19 pandemic, mewithoutYou postponed their final tour until 2022 and is scheduled to play their last concert on August 20, 2022, in Philadelphia.

Albums

Studio albums

Live albums

Extended plays and maxi singles

Studio extended plays and maxi singles

Live extended plays and maxi singles

Demo extended plays and maxi singles

Music videos

Appearances on compilations, tributes, soundtracks, and splits

Music

Video

Notes

References

External Links
 

Post-hardcore group discographies
Discographies of American artists
Christian music discographies